Margie Evans (born Marjorie Ann Johnson; July 17, 1939 – March 19, 2021) was an American blues and gospel singer and songwriter. She started recording in the late 1960s and continued to record for five decades.  She secured two hit singles on the US Billboard R&B chart.  She has variously worked with Johnny Otis, Bobby Bland, T-Bone Walker, Big Joe Turner, Lowell Fulson, Joe Liggins, Lloyd Glenn, Willie Dixon, Al Bell, and Monk Higgins.

Her main influences were Bessie Smith, Ma Rainey, Big Maybelle and Big Mama Thornton.

In addition to her musicianship, Evans was noted as a motivational speaker and rights activist, as well as a promoter of the legacy of blues music.

Life and career
Marjorie Ann Johnson was born in Shreveport, Louisiana, United States, in 1939. Raised as a devout church goer, Evans' early exposure to music was via gospel. In 1958, she moved to Los Angeles. She initially sang as a backing vocalist with Billy Ward between 1958 and 1964, before joining the Ron Marshall Orchestra between 1964 and 1969.  She then successfully auditioned to join Johnny Otis Band. During her four-year stay there, she performed on The Johnny Otis Show Live at Monterey and Cuttin' Up albums. In addition to her recording and performing duties, Evans used her influence to help set up the Southern California Blues Society to help promote the art form through education and sponsorship.

Evans commenced her solo career in 1973, and found almost immediate chart success.  Her track "Good Feeling" (United Artists 246) entered the R&B chart on June 30, 1973 for four weeks, reaching number 55. However, it was another four years before "Good Thing Queen - Part 1" (ICA 002) entered the same chart listing on July 9, 1977 for eight weeks, peaking at number 47. In 1975 she supplied backing vocals on Donald Byrd's album, Stepping into Tomorrow.

Also sandwiched between these hits, in November 1975, Evans appeared on German television filmed at the Berlin-based Jazz Tage concert with Johnny "Guitar" Watson, Bo Diddley and James Booker. Using Bobby Bland as her record producer and part-time song writing partner, Evans co-wrote the song "Soon As the Weather Breaks", which reached number 76 (R&B) for Bland in 1980.

In 1980, Evans performed at the San Francisco Blues Festival and Long Beach Blues Festival, repeating the feat at the latter a year later.  Her touring saw Evans take part in the American Folk Blues Festivals in 1981, 1982 and 1985. In 1983, Evans was granted the Keepin' the Blues Alive Award by the Blues Foundation.

Performing into the early 1990s, Evans toured the United States, Canada and Europe, as well as appearing with Jay McShann at the Toronto Jazz Festival. In the same decade, Evans continued her welfare work, by helping to organise the 5-4 Optimist Club for children from the South Central Los Angeles district.  Her 1996 album, Drowning in the Sea of Love was her last solo output. She recorded three albums with the Swiss blues singer Philipp Fankhauser in 1989, 1994 and 2016 respectively. In 2015 and 2016, Evans returned to the stage, guesting with Fankhauser in front of sold out venues throughout Switzerland.

She died on March 19, 2021, aged 81.

Discography

Albums

Singles

Collaborations and compilation albums

Music catalogue / compositions
All information from the database of BMI.com

See also
List of blues musicians

References

1939 births
2021 deaths
American blues singers
American gospel singers
Musicians from Shreveport, Louisiana
Writers from Shreveport, Louisiana
African-American women singer-songwriters
20th-century African-American women singers
21st-century American women
Singer-songwriters from Louisiana